Athleisure is a hybrid style of athletic clothing typically worn as everyday wear. Athleisure outfits can include yoga pants, tights, sneakers, leggings and shorts that look like athletic wear, characterized as "fashionable, dressed-up sweats and exercise clothing". Since the 2010s, it has become more common to wear gym clothes outside the gym, whether the wearer is exercising or not.

Athleisure can be considered a fashion industry movement, enabled by improved textile materials which allow sportswear to be more versatile, comfortable, and fashionable.

Background
In the 1930s, Champion began producing hoodies for laborers working in freezing temperatures. In 1958, DuPont invented spandex, a crucial athleisure component. Adidas popularized athletic fashion by introducing sport-to-street tracksuits in 1963. By the 1970s, athletic fashion was ubiquitous in street culture and grew in popularity in the 1980s from hip hop music videos.

By some accounts, the athleisure trend in the 21st century grew out of women wearing yoga pants, and the convenience of wearing clothes for multiple occasions without having to change. Its popularity may have stemmed from its ability to fill a gap in the market, when athletic apparel was once merely functional rather than stylish. Another account suggests that the cyclical nature of blue jean sales has allowed athleisure apparel to supplant denim as casual wear. Sportswear that had been worn exclusively in gyms is now being worn elsewhere by young adults and fitness-conscious consumers and has been accompanied by a relaxation in dress codes. The styles, colors, and fabrics of athleisure suggest a broader emphasis on fashion as opposed to functionality. Innovations in textiles have brought improvements in functionality, such that garments and footwear have become more breathable, lightweight, and waterproof. The new garments are performance enhancing and allow wearers to carry out everyday activities easily.

Evolution in the 2020s 
By 2020, a so-called "next-gen athleisure" category had emerged, owing to increasing acceptance in the workplace and advances in fabric and production technology, for instance yoga pants that double as totally acceptable office pants. The COVID-19 pandemic contributed to a continued increase in the popularity of athleisure wear. Some fashion brands that had previously made streetwear or suits pivoted to items like hoodies and jogging trousers, since many people were quarantined at home and wanted comfortable clothing that would still look stylish for virtual meetings.

Market size and trends
Reports in USA Today and The Wall Street Journal in 2015 described the athleisure market as growing, displacing typical workwear styles, and cutting in to sales of jeans, with a market size in 2014 of US$35 billion, representing an 8% increase from the previous year. According to one estimate, the athleisure market, including footwear, was US$270 billion in 2016, and was estimated to grow 30% in the United States and Asia by the year 2020. The global market as of 2018, assessed by Allied Market Research, was noted as US$155 billion. In Canada as of 2019, "active" clothing made up about 25 per cent of the apparel that Canadians were buying, but in 2021 that number grew to more than one-third, and sales were growing twice as fast as other forms of clothing. A report by Market Research Future anticipates the market to surpass US$842 billion by 2028.

In spite of this, there is an arising issue regarding market saturation as traditional luxury and mass merchant brands tap into this trend. The athleisure market for casual athletic clothing has become increasingly crowded with big-box retailers such as Walmart and Target, as well as fast fashion brands joining the fray, often at cheaper prices. An analyst estimated that the athleisure market was not slowing down, with much competition and pressure on various retail outlets including sporting goods stores.

Impacts

Social 

Global shifts toward a rise in health and fitness trends has led to growing interest and participation in sports among the public. Many have actively joined clubs and competitions in order to fully adopt the characteristics of this lifestyle. Consequently, sportswear brands can utilize this opportunity to improve and introduce better quality apparel, footwear, and gear. By presenting their devotion towards a lifestyle, it thus allows brands to garner customer loyalty.

Athleisure has been promoted by celebrities such as Beyoncé and Rihanna.

Materials and technology 
New fibers enable greater odor reduction, sweat-wicking, and stretchability to conform to the body's shape. Some athleisure designs allow certain segments more breathability while other parts can have greater tension or durability. A type of athleisure sometimes called "technical wear" focuses on clothes that are more suitable for wearing to the office while being comfortable.

Environmental
There have been concerns that materials used in athleisure may have negative consequences for the environment; these chemicals include dyes and solvents and polyfluorinated chemicals and petroleum which are used to make athleisure resistant to water and grease and stains.

See also

 Sportswear (fashion)
 Athletic shoes
 Fitness culture
 Women's sports

References

2014 in fashion
American fashion
Fashion terminology
Sportswear
2010s fashion
2020s fashion